Juan Ignacio Mare (born 3 May 1995 in Córdoba, Argentina) is an Argentine professional footballer. He previously played for Club Puebla in Liga MX.

References

External links 
 
 

1995 births
Living people
Argentine footballers
Association football forwards
Real Monarchs players
Chattanooga Red Wolves SC players
Liga Premier de México players
USL Championship players
USL League One players
Argentine expatriate footballers
Argentine expatriate sportspeople in the United States
Expatriate soccer players in the United States
Expatriate footballers in Mexico
Argentine expatriate sportspeople in Mexico
Club Puebla players
Monarcas Morelia Premier players
Instituto footballers
Union Omaha players
Footballers from Córdoba, Argentina